Wong Yuk-hei (born 25 January 1999), better known mononymously as Lucas, is a Hong Kong rapper, singer, and model based in South Korea. He is a member of the South Korean boy group NCT, its Chinese sub-unit WayV and rotational sub-unit NCT U, as well as the supergroup SuperM. In China, he has appeared as a regular cast member of the seventh and ninth season of the popular variety show Keep Running.

Early life
Lucas was born on 25 January 1999 in Sha Tin, Hong Kong, to a Chinese father with Teochew ancestry and a Thai mother. He has one younger brother and attended Tung Wah Group of Hospitals' Yow Kam Yuen College.

Lucas helped run a Thai restaurant in Hong Kong owned by his parents. He visited Thailand often, at least once a year, to rest and visit his mother's family.

Career

2015–2017: Pre-debut activities
In late 2015, Lucas was scouted by SM Entertainment after passing a Global Audition in Hong Kong. As an SM trainee, Lucas received training in modelling before switching to idol preparations and learning singing, rapping, and dancing. On 5 April 2017, he was introduced as a member of SM Rookies, a pre-debut training team of young trainees. On 7 April 2017, Lucas made an appearance in NCT member Ten's "Dream In A Dream" music video. Lucas, whose mother tongue is Cantonese, studied Korean and Mandarin in preparation for his debut.

2018–2019: Debut with NCT, WayV, SuperM, and solo activities
In January 2018, SM Entertainment unveiled NCT 2018, a project group for the expansive boy group NCT. Lucas, together with Kun and Jungwoo, were the group's newest members. The trio were introduced in SM's NCT 2018 Yearbook #1 on 30 January 2018. Lucas officially made his debut with NCT on 14 March with their debut studio album NCT 2018 Empathy. Lucas recorded three songs for the album as part of the sub-unit NCT U, including title tracks "Boss," "Yestoday" (both as NCT U), and "Black on Black" (as NCT 2018). To promote the album, Lucas appeared on Korean variety shows Real Man 300 and Law of the Jungle in Last Indian Ocean as a regular cast member.

Lucas was featured on Taeyeon's "All Night Long," a track recorded for her EP Something New, released in June 2018. The song peaked at number 72 on the Gaon Digital Chart. 

Lucas made his runway debut at Seoul Fashion Week in 2018, walking for fashion streetwear brand KYE, Charm's, and Kappa.

In November 2018, SM Entertainment released the digital single "Coffee Break" by Jonah Nilsson and Lucas featuring Richard Bona for its SM Station 3 project. In December 2018, Lucas was announced as part of NCT's China-based unit WayV, managed by SM Entertainment subsidiary Label V. The seven-member unit officially debuted on 17 January 2019 with their debut single album The Vision. Its lead single "Regular" was the Mandarin version of "Regular" by NCT 127. The following month, Lucas joined the cast of Chinese variety show Keep Running as a fixed cast member for its seventh season.

On 7 August 2019, Lucas was announced as a member of SuperM, a K-pop supergroup created by SM Entertainment in collaboration with Capitol Records. The group's promotions began in October, aimed at the American market. SuperM's self-titled debut EP was released on 4 October 2019 with lead single "Jopping". On 5 October, Lucas held his first concert with SuperM at the Capitol Records Building in Los Angeles, preceding a world tour with stops in North America and planned stops in Europe and Asia.

2020–present: NCT 2020, Kick Back, and hiatus 
In October 2020, Lucas returned to perform with NCT for the first time since "Black on Black" in 2018 for the second group-wide project, NCT 2020, featuring all 23 members. He participated in the album Resonance Pt. 1 on the songs "Make A Wish (Birthday Song)" and its English version, "Faded In My Last Song", and "Volcano" by NCT U, as well as "Nectar" by WayV. He also participated in the all-members single "Resonance".

On 10 March 2021, WayV released their third EP, Kick Back, with the lead single of the same name. The album became the group's first number one album on Gaon Album Chart.

Lucas rejoined Keep Running as a regular cast member for its ninth season.

On 25 August 2021, Lucas was scheduled to release the single "Jalapeño" alongside fellow WayV member Hendery. However, following controversy arising from his alleged past relationships, SM Entertainment and Label V announced that the release, as well as its promotions, had been postponed. Lucas also announced that he would temporarily halt his activities with WayV.

Discography

Singles

Soundtrack appearances

Other charted songs

Filmography

Television shows

Notes

References

External links

 Lucas at SM Town

NCT (band) members
1999 births
Living people
Hong Kong male rappers
Hong Kong male models
Hong Kong male singers
Chinese K-pop singers
SuperM members
Korean-language singers of Hong Kong
Cantonese-language singers of South Korea
Chinese television personalities
21st-century Chinese male singers
Hong Kong expatriates in South Korea
Hong Kong people of Thai descent
SM Rookies members